, is a Japanese surname. 
People with this surname include:

 Caol Uno (born 1975), Japanese mixed martial arts fighter
 Kozo Uno (born 1897), Japanese economist
 Masami Uno (born 1942), Japanese anti-Semitism propagandist
 Michael Toshiyuki Uno, film and television director
 Raymond Uno (born 1930), state district court judge
 Sandiaga Uno (born 1969), Deputy Governor of Jakarta
 Sōsuke Uno (1922–1998), 75th Prime Minister of Japan
 Shoma Uno, Figure Skater
 Tab Uno (born 1955), Salt Lake City board of education member

See also
Uno (given name)
Uno (disambiguation)